Oscar Caceres (born 22 June 1932) is a Peruvian former sports shooter. He competed at the 1956 Summer Olympics, 1964 Summer Olympics and the 1980 Summer Olympics.

References

External links
 

1932 births
Living people
Peruvian male sport shooters
Olympic shooters of Peru
Shooters at the 1956 Summer Olympics
Shooters at the 1964 Summer Olympics
Shooters at the 1980 Summer Olympics
Place of birth missing (living people)
Pan American Games medalists in shooting
Pan American Games silver medalists for Peru
Shooters at the 1959 Pan American Games
20th-century Peruvian people